Wheatley Hills is a suburb of Doncaster, England.

Wheatley Hills may also refer to
Wheatley Hills, New York, United States
Wheatley Hills Golf Club, New York, United States

See also 
Wheatley Hill, a village in County Durham, England